The year 1933 saw a number of significant events in radio broadcasting.


Events
14 January – In Spain, radio station EAJ-24 Radio Córdoba begins transmission, its first broadcast coming from the Conservatorio Superior de Música in the city.
24 February – In New Zealand, station 2YC Wellington is opened.
12 March – Fireside chat: On the Bank Crisis (the first fireside chat).
7 May – Fireside chat: Outlining the New Deal Program.
31 May – As the first step towards removing advertising from public radio, the French government introduces a broadcast receiving licence fee payable by owners of radio sets (15 francs per crystal set, 50 francs per valve radio).
24 July – Fireside chat: On the Purposes and Foundations of the Recovery Program. Roosevelt introduces the concept of the "first 100 days".
18 August – In Germany, the Volksempfänger ("people's receiver"), a readily affordable radio set designed to be capable, as far as possible, of picking up only the transmissions of government-controlled stations, is presented at the 10th International Radio Show, Berlin.
22 October – Fireside chat: On the Currency Situation.

Debuts
31 January – The Lone Ranger (1933–1955) (WXYZ Detroit)
7 March – Marie the Little French Princess (CBS; first daytime radio serial)
17 March – The Armour Jester (NBC Blue Network)
11 June – Carefree Carnival (NBC Red) 
23 June – Don McNeill's Breakfast Club (NBC Blue Network) 
31 July – Jack Armstrong, the All-American Boy (CBS)
14 August – Ma Perkins (WLW Cincinnati).  On 4 December, the program moves to the full NBC Red Network. 
24 September – Broadway Varieties (CBS) 
25 September – The Tom Mix Ralston Straight Shooters (NBC)
2 October – The National Barn Dance (NBC Blue Network)
8 October – The Baker's Broadcast (NBC Blue Network). 
22 October – The American Revue (CBS). 
30 October – The Romance of Helen Trent (CBS)
11 November – The Admiral Byrd Broadcasts (CBS)
18 November – In Town Tonight (BBC National Programme)
29 November – Calling All Cars (CBS West Coast network)
UNDATED – The Oldsmobile Program (CBS)

Endings
May – WPAW is merged into WPRO.

Births
13 March – Gloria McMillan, American actress, plays Harriet Conklin in Our Miss Brooks.
17 June – Harry Browne (died 2006), American libertarian writer, politician, U.S. Presidential candidate in 1996 and 2000, and radio talk show host.
3 December – Les Crane (died 2008), San Francisco-based radio announcer and television talk show host who wins a Grammy for his recording of the poem Desiderata''.
19 November – Larry King (died 2021), American radio and television host (WIOD).

References

 
Radio by year